The 2016-17 season was the 11th in BCIHL history. It saw its first NHL alumni, Patrick Holland join the University of Victoria. Simon Fraser University would finish first in the league clinching the regular season championship on the final day of the season with a 3-1 win over the Trinity Western Spartans. TWU's Evan Last finished as leading scorer. In the playoffs Trinity Western defeated the four time defending league champion Selkirk College Saints two games to zero, and the University of Victoria upset regular season champions Simon Fraser University winning two games to zero. In the final the University of Victoria would once again come up with an upset, beating Trinity Western two games to one and claiming their 4th league championship.

Regular season

Playoffs

.

† Defending champion

References

2016 in ice hockey
2017 in ice hockey